The Alfred and Hennie Huetter House, at 187 E. 5600 South in Murray, Utah, was built in 1936. It was listed on the National Register of Historic Places in 2019.

It is a one-and-a-half-story "cottage with English Tudor and eclectic Swiss/German period cottage stylistic details." It has a timber-framed stucco exterior.

References

Houses completed in 1936
Tudor Revival architecture in Utah
National Register of Historic Places in Salt Lake County, Utah
Buildings and structures in Murray, Utah
Houses on the National Register of Historic Places in Utah